Valery Nikolayevich Ryzhakov (23 December 1945, Moscow – 31 December 2015, Moscow) was a Soviet and Russian film and theater actor, Honored Artist of the RSFSR (1984), winner of the USSR State Prize (1980).

Biography 
In 1967 Ryzhakov he graduated from the VGIK (Vladimir Belokurov course). From 1968 to 1970, he served as an actor troupe Russian Army Theatre. From 1970 to 1992, actor Gorky Film Studio. He became widely known for his role as Nikolai Petrovich from the cult of the military action movie by director Yaropolk Lapshin .

In the early 1990s he has left an acting career and became an entrepreneur, successfully engaged in publishing. But financial failure and betrayal associates forced him to stop work. Went to religion. Together with his wife he served in the Church of the Trinity in the Trinity-Golenishchevo.

Valery Ryzhakov died December 31, 2015 in Moscow. He was buried at the  Vostryakovskoye Cemetery.

Selected filmography
 Chronicle of Flaming Years (1961) as schoolboy
 My Friend, Kolka! (1961) as schoolboy
 Commissar (1966) as cadet
 Officers (1971) as Captain Yury Sergeyev
   Yurka's Sunrises (1974) as Yuri
 Casket of Maria Medici (1980) as Vladimir Lyusin, police captain
 Express on Fire (1981) as stowaway passenger
 Before the Dawn (1989) as Nikolai Petrovich

Awards
 USSR State Prize (1980)
 Honored Artist of the RSFSR (1984)

References

External links

1945 births
2015 deaths
Russian male film actors
Russian male stage actors
Soviet male film actors
Soviet male stage actors
Male actors from Moscow
20th-century Russian male actors
Soviet male voice actors
Russian male voice actors
Honored Artists of the RSFSR
Recipients of the USSR State Prize
Gerasimov Institute of Cinematography alumni